Ziarat (also Romanized as Zīārat, Zeyārat, Ziyārat, and Ziyaret; also known as Bandar-e Zīyārat) is a village in Behdasht Rural District, Kushk-e Nar District, Parsian County, Hormozgan Province, Iran. At the 2006 census, its population was 866, in 184 families.

References 

Populated places in Parsian County